Lithuanian Typewriter may refer to:

 A fictional sexual activity in The Curious Sofa by Edward Gorey
 The ĄŽERTY keyboard layout: see International QWERTY keyboards#Lithuanian